Ribstone was a provincial electoral district in Alberta mandated to return a single member to the Legislative Assembly of Alberta using the first past the post method of voting from 1913 to 1940.

Ribstone is named for the Hamlet of Ribstone, Alberta.

Members of the Legislative Assembly (MLAs)

Electoral history

1913 general election

1917 general election

1921 general election

1926 general election

1930 general election

1935 general election

See also
List of Alberta provincial electoral districts
Ribstone, Alberta, a hamlet in eastern Alberta

References

Further reading

External links
Elections Alberta
The Legislative Assembly of Alberta

Former provincial electoral districts of Alberta